Bay Malasi is a village in Badakhshan Province in north-eastern Afghanistan.

References

External links
Satellite map at Maplandia.com

Populated places in Argo District